Apotoforma dolosa is a species of moth of the family Tortricidae. It is found in Guatemala and Colombia.

The wingspan is about 14 mm. The forewings are fawn-brown with a slight rosy tinge. There is a series of black marginal spots along the apex and termen. The hindwings are brownish fuscous.

References

Moths described in 1914
Tortricini
Moths of Central America
Moths of South America